Lebogang Manyama (born 13 September 1990), nicknamed “Kaka” is a South African professional soccer player who plays as a midfielder for Cape Town City and the South Africa national soccer team.

Early life 
Manyama was born in Tembisa but grew up in Alexandra, north of Johannesburg. He attended Northview High School.

Club career

Ajax Cape Town
Lebogang Manyama made his professional debut for Ajax Cape Town on 20 August 2010 against Mamelodi Sundowns, winning (4–3) on penalties after a 1–1 draw, in a quarterfinal match of the 2010 MTN 8 tournament at Athlone Stadium in Cape Town. He was acquired by Ajax Cape Town in the summer of 2010 as a transfer from FC Alexandra. During his time at Ajax he was a stand out player in the South African Premier League and was subsequently acquired by Supersport United.

SuperSport United
He went on to play for Supersport United who later on loaned him to Mpumalanga Black Aces for the 2015/16 season. He had a good season however his season came to an end after he suffered an injury during the latter stages of the season.

Cape Town City FC
In 2016, Lebo was signed by Cape Town City F.C. and was subsequently named Captain for the team's inaugural 2016/17 Premier Soccer League campaign. He made history in the club's opening PSL season by guiding them to the prestigious Telkom Knockout Cup trophy, in a 2-1 victory over Supersport United. In this season he was the League's top goalscorer and named South African player of the year. His role at Cape Town City has seen him cement his place in the national team and is regarded currently as the best player in South Africa.

Kaizer Chiefs
After a short spell with the Turkish side Konyaspor, Manyama signed for Kaizer Chiefs  He went on to lead the Glamour boys' forward line alongside ex-Sundowns duo of Khama Billiat and Leanardo Castro alongside Serbian marksman Samir Nukovic to help Chiefs finish second to Sundowns and subsequently qualify for the CAF Champions League.

International career
Manyama has made 11 appearances for the South African National Team netting 1 goal. He is mostly used as an attacking midfielder or false-nine in the national team as he interchanges comfortably between a midfield or striking role. He made his Bafana Bafana debut in 2013 and continues to be selected, with the most recent call-ups in June 2017 for the AFCON qualifier against Nigeria and the international friendly against Zambia.

International goals
Scores and results list South Africa's goal tally first.

Honours

Club
Cape Town City FC
2016 Telkom Knockout: Winner
2016–17 South African Premier Division: Player of the month - October, November, December, February

Supersport United
2014 Telkom Knockout: Winner

References

External links
NFT Profile

1990 births
Living people
People from Tembisa
Northern Sotho people
South African soccer players
Cape Town Spurs F.C. players
SuperSport United F.C. players
Mpumalanga Black Aces F.C. players
Cape Town City F.C. (2016) players
Konyaspor footballers
South African Premier Division players
Süper Lig players
Association football midfielders
Sportspeople from Gauteng